Sports Tonight is an American sports news television program that aired on CNN from 1980 to 2001, and on CNN/SI from December 12, 1996 to the station's demise on May 15, 2002. It normally aired at 11 p.m. ET/10 p.m. CT..

History

The early years
When CNN went on the air on June 1, 1980 one of the first newscasts was a sports bulletin where baseball and North American Soccer League highlights were shown. Later, a nightly program called Sports Tonight went on the air in late night. During this time, Nick Charles and Fred Hickman became established as the program's co-hosts. In addition, CNN aired a weekend program called Sports Saturday and Sports Sunday.

One of the program's most popular features was called "Play of the Day" (later known as the "Replay of the Day"), which showed a highlight (i.e., a spectacular play) from that day's action.

The 1990s and the end
In 1996, CNN launched a new station called CNN/SI. Sports Tonight was renamed CNN/Sports Illustrated, and was replayed many times throughout the night on CNN/SI, like ESPN was doing (and continues to do) with SportsCenter.

The program reclaimed its Sports Tonight name shortly afterwards, and when CNN pre-empted the show in late 2000 due to the coverage of the disputed 2000 presidential election, producers decided to differentiate the format from SportsCenters highlights. Sports Tonight was relaunched in 2001 with a sports talk format, where viewers interacted with the hosts via the Internet and toll-free phone lines about their favorite teams and players. By then, Charles was no longer hosting; Hickman and Vince Cellini were the program's hosts.

Sports Tonight continued on both CNN and CNN/SI until September 2001. When the terrorist attacks occurred on September 11, 2001, CNN went to all-news programming. Three days later, CNN announced that the program would no longer air on CNN, but remain on CNN/SI. In May 2002, CNN/SI shut down operations, and Sports Tonight ended after a 21-year run.

Aftermath
Since the cancellation of Sports Tonight, CNN has aired various programming at 11 p.m. ET, including Connie Chung Tonight, Lou Dobbs Tonight, Anderson Cooper 360, Erin Burnett OutFront, CNN Tonight and currently Don Lemon Tonight.

List of Sports Tonight hosts

Steve Berthiaume
Vince Cellini
Nick Charles
Paul Crane
John Fricke
Mike Galanos
Inga Hammond
Fred Hickman
Dan Hicks
Jim Huber
Bob Lorenz
Gary Miller
Nancy Newman
Keith Olbermann
Dan Patrick
Chris Rose
Craig Sager
Hannah Storm
Van Earl Wright
Daryn Kagan

References

External links
CNNSI.com - Television - Sports Tonight

CNN original programming
1980 American television series debuts
2002 American television series endings
1980s American television news shows
1990s American television news shows
2000s American television news shows
American sports television series
CNN/SI original programming